Peter den Oudsten (born 1951) is a Dutch politician of the Labour Party (PvdA).

He was acting mayor of Utrecht in 2020. Previously, he was mayor of Leeuwarden (acting), Meppel, Enschede, and Groningen.

Career
Den Oudsten began his career in 1975 as a civil servant in the municipality of Enschede. In 1984 he became a member and spokesperson for Provincial Energy Friesland. In 1991 he worked at Friesland Foods and became head of corporate communications. 

From 1986 to 1997, Den Oudsten was a member of the municipal council of Leeuwarden. Successively he was an alderman from 1997 to 2001. Afterwards he was mayor of Meppel from 2001 to 2005, and mayor of Enschede from 2005 to 2014. In January 2015, he was appointed mayor of Groningen.

References

1951 births
Living people
20th-century Dutch civil servants
20th-century Dutch politicians
21st-century Dutch politicians
Aldermen of Leeuwarden
Labour Party (Netherlands) politicians
Mayors in Drenthe
Mayors of Enschede
Mayors of Groningen
Mayors of Leeuwarden
Mayors of Utrecht
Municipal councillors of Leeuwarden
People from Leeuwarden
People from Meppel